Young Joe, the Forgotten Kennedy is a 1977 American made-for-television biographical film that originally aired on ABC. Based upon the biography by Hank Searls called The Lost Prince: Young Joe, the Forgotten Kennedy, the film chronicles the life of Joseph P. Kennedy Jr., the older brother of John F. Kennedy who was killed in action in World War II, leaving behind aspirations to become the first Irish-Catholic president. Young Joe stars Peter Strauss in the titular role and was directed by Richard T. Heffron.

Cast

 Peter Strauss	... 	Joe Kennedy Jr.
 Barbara Parkins	... 	Vanessa Hunt
 Stephen Elliott	... 	Joe Kennedy
 Darleen Carr	... 	Kathleen "Kick" Kennedy
 Simon Oakland	... 	Delaney
 Asher Brauner	... 	Mike Krasna
 Lance Kerwin	... 	Joe Jr. (age 14)
 Peter Fox	... 	Simpson
 Steve Kanaly	... 	Ray Pierce
 Robert Englund	... 	Willy
 Gloria Stroock	... 	Rose Kennedy
 Tara Talboy	... 	Elinor
 Ben Fuhrman	... 	Hank Riggs
 James Sikking	... 	Commander Devril
 Ken Swofford	... 	Greenway
 Sam Chew Jr.	 ... 	Jack Kennedy
 Patrick Labyorteaux	... 	Teddy Kennedy
 Shane Kerwin	... 	Bobby Kennedy
 Margie Zech	... 	Jean Kennedy
 Kirsten Larkin	... 	Rosemary Kennedy
 Rosanne Covy	... 	Eunice Kennedy
 Deirdre Berthrong	... 	Pat Kennedy
 Lawrence Driscoll	... 	Anderson
 Michael Irving	... 	Billy Harrington
 Gardner Hayes	... 	English Major

Production
The production was filmed in Seattle. Strauss, then highly popular due to his starring appearances in the television miniseries Rich Man, Poor Man, said he had turned down a million-dollar offer to continue with a third year of that miniseries before taking on the role of Joe Kennedy, and that he had researched it heavily.  The production received attention when it was discovered that Bill Foulon, an escaped convict from the Oregon State Penitentiary, had managed to secure work as an extra on the film, and later (while still on the run) called the Los Angeles Times to talk about his experience.

Reception
Reviews of the film were mixed.  Pittsburgh Post-Gazette columnist Win Fanning gave it a strongly positive review, saying that Strauss had "acquitted himself brilliantly" in portraying Kennedy as a "driven young man".  Kay Gardella of the New York Daily News gave it a moderately positive review, though she commented that Strauss, as Kennedy, had done a better job of "imitating Jack Kennedy" than Sam Chew, the actor who had actually played the future president.  On the other hand, Chris Stoehr of The Milwaukee Sentinel thought that Strauss had been "trapped" in a bad production with "unforgivably bad lines" and a failure to show the viewer Joe Kennedy's special qualities.

Author Lawrence J. Quirk later summarized the film's reception as "respectful but yawning", and noted that it had been a disappointment for Strauss and several other actors who had seen it as a career opportunity when they joined the production.

Awards
Young Joe received three nominations at the 1978 Primetime Emmy Awards, including one for Outstanding Special - Drama or Comedy, and won one, for sound mixing.

See also
 List of television films produced for American Broadcasting Company
 Cultural depictions of John F. Kennedy

References

External links
 

1977 television films
1977 films
ABC network original films
American television films
1970s English-language films
Cultural depictions of American men
Cultural depictions of John F. Kennedy
Cultural depictions of Robert F. Kennedy
Films based on biographies
Films about the Kennedy family
Films directed by Richard T. Heffron